Sally Larner (born 1 March 1969) is a British gymnast. She competed in six events at the 1984 Summer Olympics.

References

External links
 

1969 births
Living people
British female artistic gymnasts
Olympic gymnasts of Great Britain
Gymnasts at the 1984 Summer Olympics
Sportspeople from Bromsgrove